Enoggera Creek is a creek which flows through the  City of Brisbane in South-East Queensland, Australia.

Geography 
Enoggera Creek rises in the suburb of Enoggera Reservoir on the D'Aguilar Range and flows into the Brisbane River (becoming Breakfast Creek in the final stage). The creek's headwaters form on the southern slopes of Mount Nebo in Brisbane Forest Park.

Within the suburb of Enoggera Reservoir, the creek is dammed by Enoggera Dam (. After which, it meanders in a south-easterly direction, leaving the undisturbed parkland and flowing through the Brisbane suburbs of The Gap, Ashgrove (where it separates the neighbourhood of St Johns Wood from the rest of the suburb), Alderley, Newmarket, Red Hill, Kelvin Grove, Wilston, Herston, Windsor and Bowen Hills.

Ithaca Creek flows from Mount Coot-tha and joins Enoggera Creek from the south at the intersection of the suburbs of Ashgrove, Red Hill and Newmarket.

The creek officially becomes Breakfast Creek from the railway bridge at the intersection of the suburbs of Windsor, Bowen Hills, and Albion, which then flows into the Brisbane River.

The creek is being rehabilitated and restored by the community organisation called Save Our Waterways Now.

History
Significant flooding occurred along the creek during the major floods, including 1893 and 1974 Brisbane flood resulting in a number of houses being washed away.

See also

 Kedron Brook
 List of rivers of Australia
 Moggill Creek

References

External links

Rivers of Queensland
South East Queensland